The Roman Catholic Diocese of Teófilo Otoni is a diocese located in the city of Teófilo Otoni in the Ecclesiastical province of Diamantina in Brazil.

History
 November 27, 1960: Established as Diocese of Teófilo Otoni from the Diocese of Araçuaí

Bishops
 Bishops of Teófilo Otoni, in reverse chronological order
 Bishop Aloísio Jorge Pena Vitral (2009.11.25 - 2017.10.20), appointed Bishop of Sete Lagoas, Minas Gerais
 Bishop Diogo Reesink, O.F.M. (1998.03.25 – 2009.11.25)
 Bishop Waldemar Chaves de Araújo (1989.11.18 – 1996.06.26), appointed Bishop of São João del Rei, Minas Gerais
 Bishop Fernando Antônio Figueiredo, O.F.M. (1985.08.03 – 1989.03.15), appointed Bishop of Santo Amaro, São Paulo
 Bishop Quirino Adolfo Schmitz, O.F.M. (1960.12.22 – 1985.08.03)

Coadjutor bishop
Fernando Antônio Figueiredo (1984-1985), O.F.M.

Auxiliary bishops
Antônio Eliseu Zuqueto, O.F.M. Cap. (1980-1983), appointed Bishop of Teixeira de Freitas-Caravelas, Bahia
Fernando Antônio Figueiredo, O.F.M. (1984), appointed Coadjutor here

References

External links
 GCatholic.org
 Catholic Hierarchy

Roman Catholic dioceses in Brazil
Christian organizations established in 1960
Teófilo Otoni, Roman Catholic Diocese of
Roman Catholic dioceses and prelatures established in the 20th century
1960 establishments in Brazil